is a Japanese football player who plays for Avispa Fukuoka in the J1 League.

Playing career
Yamanoi was born in Chiba Prefecture on October 25, 1998. After graduating from Shizuoka Gakuen High School, he joined J2 League club Avispa Fukuoka in 2017. On June 6, 2018, he debuted against Kagoshima United FC in Emperor's Cup.

Club statistics
Updated to 21 July 2022.

References

External links

1998 births
Living people
Association football people from Chiba Prefecture
Japanese footballers
J2 League players
Avispa Fukuoka players
Association football goalkeepers